Saint Petersburg, Russia is home to more than a hundred theatres and theatre companies. This list includes theatre companies that regularly produce plays and buildings used for theatrical performances.

The first permanent professional public theatre in Russia, the "Russian Theatre for the Performance of Tragedies and Comedies" (Русский для представления трагедий и комедий театр) was established in St. Petersburg in 1756 by order of Empress Elizabeth. In 1785 the Hermitage Theatre was opened in the Hermitage palace complex. This is the oldest theatre building in St. Petersburg that has been preserved in its original form.

Dramatic theatres

Opera and ballet theatres

Musical theatres

Puppet theatres

Other theatres

Theatrical and concert venues

Notes

Saint Petersburg
 
Theatres in Saint Petersburg
Theatres